The Free Socialist Party of Burundi (abbreviated Parsocilibre) was a political party in Burundi. Parsocilibre was founded in March 1961. It was led by Michel Buyoya (former president of UPROHUTU) and Pascal Baranyikwa. The party supported constitutional monarchy. It had its office in Kayanza.

References

Defunct political parties in Burundi
Monarchism in Burundi
Monarchist parties in Burundi
Political parties established in 1961
1961 establishments in Burundi
Political parties with year of disestablishment missing